Deh-e Bala or Deh Bala or Dehbala may refer to:

Afghanistan
 Deh Bala, Afghanistan

Iran
 Deh-e Bala, Abadeh, Fars Province
 Deh-e Bala, Mohr, Fars Province
 Deh-e Bala, Kerman
 Deh-e Bala, Bardsir, Kerman Province
 Deh-e Bala, Qaleh Ganj, Kerman Province
 Deh-e Bala, Rafsanjan, Kerman Province
 Deh Bala, Sirjan, Kerman Province
 Deh Bala, Nuq, Rafsanjan County, Kerman Province
 Deh-e Bala, Rudbar-e Jonubi, Kerman Province
 Deh-e Bala, Shahr-e Babak, Kerman Province
 Deh Bala, Sirjan, Kerman Province
 Deh-e Bala, Zarand, Kerman Province
 Deh Bala, Kermanshah
 Deh Bala, Sonqor, Kermanshah Province
 Deh-e Bala, Nukabad, Khash County, Sistan and Baluchestan Province